The Mississippi Wing of Civil Air Patrol (CAP) is the highest echelon of Civil Air Patrol in the state of Mississippi. Mississippi Wing headquarters are located in Jackson, Mississippi. The Mississippi Wing consists of over 500 cadet and adult members at over 16 locations across the state of Mississippi.

Mission
Civil Air Patrol has three missions: providing emergency services; offering cadet programs for youth; and providing aerospace education for both Civil Air Patrol members and the general public.

Emergency services
The CAP actively provides emergency services, includes search and rescue and disaster relief operations, as well as assisting in the providing of humanitarian aid. In 2014, the Mississippi Wing performed six search and rescue missions and saved six lives.

The CAP also provides Air Force support through conducting light transport, communications support, and low-altitude route surveys. Civil Air Patrol can also offer support to counter-drug missions.

Cadet programs
The CAP offers cadet programs for youth aged 12 to 21, which includes providing aerospace education, leadership training, physical fitness and moral leadership to cadets.

Aerospace education
The CAP provides aerospace education for both CAP members and the general public. Fulfilling the education component of the overall CAP mission includes training members of CAP, offering workshops for youth throughout the nation through schools, and providing education through public aviation events.

Organization

See also
Mississippi Air National Guard
Mississippi State Guard

References

External links
Mississippi Wing Civil Air Patrol Official Website

Wings of the Civil Air Patrol
Education in Mississippi
Military in Mississippi